Lukman Avaran (born 22 May 1990) is an Indian actor who primarily works in Malayalam cinema. Dayom Panthrandum (2013) was the first theatre-released movie in his career. Lukman acted the lead role in the 2021 movie Operation Java directed by Tharun Moorthy. He was mainly noted for his performances in the movies Operation Java, Virus, Thallumaala, Saudi Vellakka.

Early and Personal Life 
Lukman Avaran hails from Changaramkulam, in Alamkode panchayat, Malappuram District in Kerala, as the son of Koladikkal Avaran and Haleema. He is a B Tech graduated from Royal College of Engineering & Technology, Chermanangad, Thrissur. He was married with Jumaima on 20th February 2022.

Career 
His acting career was started by a short film Kittuo (2013). His first silver appearance was Dayom Panthrandum (2013) Written by Harshad PK and Muhsin Parari, Directed by Harshad PK and this movie wasn't released in theatres. His first notable performance was in the movie KL10 Patthu (2015) Written & Directed by Muhsin Parari.

In 2019, his role in Unda of a police officer from an Adivasi community, Biju Kumar was noticed by the audience. In 2021, Operation Java Written & Directed by Tharun Moorthy, Lukman had a major role as Vinaya Dasan along with Balu Varghese. In the following years, he performed many supporting characters in many films. He played pivotal roles in Thallumaala (2022) along with Tovino Thomas by Khalid Rahman and also in the Tharun Moorthy's second film Saudi Vellakka (2022) along with Binu Pappu. The film Saudi Vellakka was screened under Indian Panorama segment of IFFI 53.

Filmography

Awards

References

External links 
 Lukman Avaran at IMDb

1990 births
Living people
21st-century Indian male actors
People from Malappuram district
Male actors in Malayalam cinema